Ruth Habwe (died 1996) was a Kenyan activist and politician.

Early life and career 
Habwe was a pioneer among those working to advance women's causes in Kenya. Trained as a teacher at the Kabete Teacher's Training College, she later attended the Jeanes School alongside Margaret Koinange and Muthoni Likmani. She was an early leader of Maendeleo Ya Wanawake, which she chaired from 1968 until 1971. During her tenure the organization passed resolutions calling for such things as more women on the faculty of the University of Nairobi and for equal employment conditions. Habwe ran for parliament in 1964, one of few women to challenge the domination of men in that body.  The decision was not without controversy; she failed to receive support from her political party, the Kenyan African National Union, and so ran as an independent. This so incensed party leadership that she was expelled from its rolls. She was told, furthermore, by other MPs "to go back to the Kitchen and cook for Mr. Habwe's children". Habwe was a member of the Luhya tribe. She had five children.

References

Year of birth unknown
1996 deaths
Kenyan women's rights activists
Luhya people
20th-century Kenyan educators
20th-century Kenyan women politicians
20th-century Kenyan politicians
Kenya African National Union politicians